The Stockholm International Film Festival is an annual film festival held in Stockholm, Sweden. It was launched in 1990 and has been held every year since then during the second half of November. 

The winning film in the international competition section is awarded the Bronze Horse (Bronshästen). At 7,3kg (16 lb) the Bronze Horse is the heaviest film award in the world. It is also a paraphrase on a national design icon, the Swedish Dala horse, and was created by artist Fredrik Swärd.

Since its start the Stockholm International Film Festival has focused on supporting new talents through competitions and scholarships. As many as a third of the films selected for the competition are made by a debuting director and by directors who have made fewer than three films.

In 2011 "The Stockholm Film Festival Feature Film Award" was inaugurated which funds a feature film for an unestablished female director. The aim for Stockholm International Film Festival is to broaden the selection of films in Sweden with creative new films of high quality and offer the visitor an orientation within modern film. With seminars, gala screenings, opportunities to meet actors and filmmakers during the festival, the festival strives to be central meeting point for filmmakers and film audiences in Sweden.

The festival is visited by hundreds of filmmakers and since its inception such celebrities as Dennis Hopper, Lauren Bacall, Gena Rowlands, Charlotte Rampling, Susan Sarandon, Ang Lee, Andrea Arnold, David Cronenberg, Roman Polanski, Terry Gilliam, David Lynch, Claire Denis, Elia Kazan, Céline Sciamma, Francis Ford Coppola, Wong Kar-Wai and Uma Thurman have visited the festival and met the audience at the cinemas. 

The festival also organizes mobile film workshops for children and teenagers, screenings for festival members throughout the year as well as the Stockholm Film Festival Junior, an annual film festival for children and youth during the spring. The main goal of Stockholm Film Festival Junior is to provide access to quality film from every corner of the world for young audiences – films that otherwise would not reach the mainstream film repertoire. All screenings are free of charge for everyone between 6 and 19 years old.

Since 1990 the Stockholms International Film Festival is also the host of Summer Cinema, an outdoor cinema open to the public during August in Stockholm. Summer Cinema has taken place in different venues in the Swedish capital, for example Stockholm Olympic Stadium, Berzelii park and Rålambshovsparken.

History 
Stockholm Film Festival was founded in 1990 by the three film enthusiasts Git Scheynius, Kim Klein and Ignas Shceynius. The first festival took place over four days, with its opening film being "Wild at Heart" by David Lynch. In 1994 the Stockholm Film Festival took a step into the digital age as the first film festival in the world with its own website.

Stockholm Film Festival celebrated its 20th anniversary in 2009 by screening films on a specially made ice screen in Kungsträdgården. Susan Sarandon, who attended the festival to receive the Stockholm Lifetime Achievement Award, helped to unveil the canvas before the screening of "The Rocky Horror Picture Show". At the festival's 30th anniversary celebration in 2019, several tons of ice were yet again transported from Torneälven, 1227 km to the capital to recreate the ice canvas in Kungsträdgården.

David Lynch visited the festival for the first time in 2003 to receive the Stockholm Lifetime Achievement Award, 13 years after "Wild at Heart" inaugurated the very first edition of the Stockholm Film Festival. According to reports, the director drank huge amounts of coffee in the lobby of the old Lydmar Hotel and was more than happy to talk to his fans in town. When director and actor Peter Fonda arrived at the festival as chairman of the jury in 2012, he made his entrance in style, escorted to the Skandia cinema by an entire motorcycle gang.

The Chinese artist and activist Ai Weiwei was part of the festival jury in 2013 but could not be present as he was under house arrest in his home country. He created the work of art "The Chair of Nonattendance" which was sent to Stockholm; an empty chair that is impossible to sit in. The collaboration inspired the establishment of the Stockholm Impact Award; one of the world's largest film prizes, which was awarded for the first time in 2015 in collaboration with the City of Stockholm. The prize is awarded to filmmakers who raise important societal issues.

Awards

Bronze horse: Best film 
The following films have received the top honour at the festival, the 7.3 kg Bronze Horse statute for best film.

Stockholm Lifetime Achievement Award 
Stockholm Lifetime Achievement Award is given as an honour for a lifework within cinema.
 1990 – Roger Corman
 1991 – Dennis Hopper
 1992 – Viveca Lindfors
 1994 – Quentin Tarantino
 1995 – Jean Paul Gaultier
 1996 – Rod Steiger
 1997 – Elia Kazan
 1998 – Gena Rowlands
 1999 – Roman Polanski
 2000 – Lauren Bacall
 2001 – Jean-Luc Godard
 2002 – Erland Josephson
 2003 – David Lynch
 2004 – Oliver Stone
 2005 – David Cronenberg
 2006 – Lasse Hallström
 2007 – Paul Schrader
 2008 – Charlotte Rampling
 2009 – Susan Sarandon
 2010 – Harriet Andersson
 2011 – Isabelle Huppert
 2012 – Jan Troell
 2013 – Claire Denis
 2014 – Mike Leigh
 2015 – Stephen Frears
 2016 – Francis Ford Coppola
 2018 – Mary Harron
 2019 – Max von Sydow
 2020 – Martin Scorsese and Isabella Rossellini
 2021 – Jane Campion
 2022 – Anthony Hopkins

Stockholm Visionary Award 
Stockholm Visionary Award was instituted 2004 to note visionaries within modern film.
 2004 – Todd Solondz
 2005 – Terry Gilliam
 2006 – Darren Aronofsky
 2007 – Wes Anderson
 2008 – Wong Kar-wai
 2009 – Luc Besson
 2010 – Gus Van Sant
 2011 – Alejandro González Iñárritu
 2012 – Jacques Audiard
 2013 – Peter Greenaway
 2014 – Roy Andersson
 2015 – Yorgos Lanthimos
 2016 – François Ozon
 2018 – Asghar Farhadi
 2019 – Céline Sciamma
 2020 – Matteo Garrone
 2021 – Joachim Trier
 2022 – Sam Mendes

Stockholm Achievement Award 
 2012 – Willem Dafoe
 2014 – Uma Thurman
 2015 – Ellen Burstyn
 2018 – Gunnel Lindblom
 2019 – Payman Maadi
 2020 – Viggo Mortensen
 2021 – Kenneth Branagh and Robin Wright
 2022 – Fares Fares

Audience Award 
The peoples choice.

Rising Star Award 
Prize is awarded to an actor who has made distinctive achievements in film and has the ability to become tomorrow's star. The purpose of the award is to highlight an actor early in their career.
 2008 – Malin Crépin
 2009 – Anastasios Soulis
 2010 – Alicia Vikander
 2011 – Malin Buska
 2012 – Nermina Lukac
 2013 – Adam Lundgren
 2014 – Julia Ragnarsson
 2015 – Aliette Opheim
 2016 – Filip Berg
 2017 – Gustav Lindh
 2021 – Edvin Ryding
 2022 – Sara Shirpey

References

External links 

 Stockholm International Film Festival

Tourist attractions in Stockholm
Annual events in Sweden
1990 establishments in Sweden
Film festivals established in 1990
Autumn events in Sweden